Victaulic is a developer and manufacturer of mechanical pipe joining systems, and the originator of the grooved pipe couplings joining system. The firm is a global company with 15 major manufacturing facilities, 28 branches, and over 3600 employees worldwide. Currently, its headquarters is located in Easton, Pennsylvania. Director level leadership is helmed by the Bancroft family; Standard Oil heirs and former owners of The Wall Street Journal and Dow Jones & Company. The latter half of Victaulic was controlled by Prince Pierre D'Arenberg of France, known for  active involvement in several youth charities along with ties to Ghislaine Maxwell and Jeffrey Epstein.

Products

Grooved coupling pipe joining systems uses a roll grooving technique to join pipes and pipe joining components. A groove is formed on the outside of the pipes near the ends to be joined. Each groove receives a gasket, and these ends are then the male partners into a female coupling housing. The gasket creates a pressure responsive seal on the outside diameter of the pipe, unlike standard compression joints, where pressure acts to separate the seal. The gasket sealing is enhanced as the coupling housing is tightened onto the pipe end. "The economics of the grooved method derive from simplified assembly that involves three basic concepts: a pressure responsive gasket that creates a leak-tight seal; couplings that hold the pipe together; and fasteners that secure the couplings.

Victaulic specializes in the development of couplings, valves, and fitting technologies for a variety of industries. Its main products are:
Grooved couplings used to join mechanical pipes together. The company produces a variety of these grooved couplings along with other technologies since it was founded.
A fire supressions system intended for critical locations like data centers. It emits a mix of water and nitrogen from a single source that simultaneously cools the affected area and extinguishes the fire. It is approved for use in areas containing flammable liquids & hazardous machinery.
Sprinkler heads and Sprinkler systems, Grooved valves and Grooved pipe fittings, and expansion joints.

History

The original purpose of the Victaulic pipe joint was for military applications but quickly gained popularity in other commercial and industrial markets. The concept emerged when inventor Lieutenant Ernest Tribe, of the Royal Engineers, devised a special form of joint for use on pipes and cylinders containing gases and chemicals under very high pressure. Tribe, in conjunction with Dr Henry Hele-Shaw, a noted English hydraulic engineer, had been engaged by the British Government during the war to advance trench warfare tactics.

On 4 April 1919, Lt Tribe filed the patent for what is now known as the Victaulic coupling.

Shortly thereafter, the Victory Pipe Joint Co. was established in London, England and a second patent was filed in both names. Dr Hele-Shaw had numerous inventions including the multiple-plate clutch, stream-line filter, variable-pitch propeller, and Victaulic pipe joint.

Victaulic fittings were used in tunnels, ship work, and borings. The demand for dependable pipeline systems increased during World War II. The earlier methods of distributing petroleum during war included shipping it overseas and dispersing by tank car, truck, or rail.

Litigation

In 2014, Benson Tower Condominium owners brought an action against Victaulic relating to alleged elastomer degradation due to chloramine and temperatures. Plaintiff alleges that "[s]ince the early 1990s, Victaulic was aware that its Victaulic Products were susceptible to failure when exposed to chloramines or other approved and recommended applications and that the failure of the Victaulic Products caused damage to the systems and buildings into which they were installed." FAC ¶ 78. Specifically, "[b]efore construction of [Benson Tower], Victaulic knew that the Victaulic Products would fail when exposed to temperatures far less than 230° Fahrenheit, even though Victaulic represented and approved that the Victaulic Products were acceptable and recommended for use up to 230 °F. Victaulic failed to disclose this fact to its consumers, including Plaintiff." Victaulic filed a motion to dismiss the Plaintiff's claims.  In the end, the court rule that "defendant Victaulic Company's motion to dismiss Plaintiff's claims for fraud, negligent misrepresentation, and violation of the UTPA and to strike punitive damages (Dkt. 58) is granted in part and denied in part."

In 2017, Victaulic settled $600,000 in a claim brought against the company for U.S. trade compliance violations. Customs Fraud Investigations, LLC suspected Victaulic Company failed to pay marking duties to the United States by knowingly importing unmarked foreign-made pipe fittings without telling United States Customs. The case and ruling continue to be used as a reference for trade compliance and customs laws.

See also

References

External links

 Victaulic

Manufacturing companies based in Pennsylvania
Companies based in Northampton County, Pennsylvania